Richard Dodson (born 19 February 1959) is a visually impaired New Zealand sailor. He has won several world championships in sailing, including but not limited to two America's Cups and an Admiral's Cup. Dodson also competed in the 2016 Summer Paralympics.

Accomplishments

Sailing career
Dodson joined Team New Zealand and sailed on NZL 32 in the afterguard during their 1995 America's Cup win. He sailed in Team New Zealand's 2000 America's Cup defense before joining OneWorld Challenge for the 2003 Louis Vuitton Cup.

While preparing for the 2003 America's Cup, he sailed on Team Tyco in leg 3 of the 2001–02 Volvo Ocean Race. Leg 3 included the 2001 Sydney to Hobart Yacht Race.

In 2013 he became involved with Kiwi Gold Sailing, a group of Paralympians qualifying in a Sonar for the 2016 Paralympics. The team originally included fellow America's Cup veteran David Barnes, who later had to withdraw.

As Skipper, he represented New Zealand at the 2016 Summer Paralympics, sailing with Andrew May and Chris Sharp in a Sonar. The team placed fourth in the event.

Personal life

In 1997, Dodson found out he had multiple sclerosis. However, he only informed fellow sailor Jeremy Scantlebury during the 2000 campaign. Despite worsening eyesight, Dodson continued to sail, and has subsequently participated in the 2016 Summer Paralympics.

References

External links 
  (archive)
 

1959 births
Living people
New Zealand male sailors (sport)
OK class sailors
World champions in sailing for New Zealand
People with multiple sclerosis
2003 America's Cup sailors
2000 America's Cup sailors
1995 America's Cup sailors
Volvo Ocean Race sailors
Paralympic sailors of New Zealand
Sailors at the 2016 Summer Paralympics
OK class world champions